Haplogroup M may refer to:
 Haplogroup M (mtDNA), a human mitochondrial DNA (mtDNA) haplogroup
 Haplogroup M (Y-DNA), a human Y-chromosome (Y-DNA) haplogroup